Daniel Cruz may refer to:
 Daniel Cruz (footballer, born 1981), Belgian football midfielder
 Daniel Cruz (footballer, born 2001), Brazilian football forward
 Daniel Cruz (footballer, born 1982), Brazilian football defender
 Daniel Cruz (footballer, born 1990), Brazilian football forward
 Danny Cruz (born 1990), American soccer player